Annika Billstam (born 8 March 1976) is a Swedish orienteering competitor living in Uppsala. Formerly competing for OK Linné in Uppsala, Annika moved to Stockholm and switched to IFK Lidingö in the winter of 2007 before switching back to OK Linné in January 2012. She earned a silver medal in the relay at the 2007 World Orienteering Championships in Kyiv. She followed that with bronze medals in the long distance and the relay at the 2008 World Orienteering Championships in the Czech Republic.

In 2012, Billstam won the Swedish mountain marathon Vértex Fjällmaraton.

References

External links
 
 

1976 births
Living people
Swedish orienteers
Female orienteers
Foot orienteers
World Orienteering Championships medalists
World Games gold medalists
Competitors at the 2013 World Games
World Games medalists in orienteering
21st-century Swedish women